This is a list of the butterflies of India belonging to the family Nymphalidae and an index to the species articles. This forms part of the full List of butterflies of India.

Danainae (26 spp)
See List of butterflies of India (Danainae).

Morphinae (20 spp)
Please see List of butterflies of India (Morphinae).

Satyrinae (176 spp)
Please see List of butterflies of India (Satyrinae).

Limenitidinae (99 spp)
Please see List of butterflies of India (Limenitidinae)

Libytheinae
 European or common beak, Libythea celtis (Laicharting, [1782]) earlier Libythea lepita (Moore, 1857).

 Whitespotted beak, Libythea narina (Marshall, 1880)
 Club beak, Libythea myrrha (Godart, 1819)

Charaxinae

Charaxes - rajahs
 Chestnut rajah, Charaxes durnfordi Distant, 1884
 Tawny rajah, Charaxes bernardus (Fabricius, 1793) 
 Scarce tawny rajah, Charaxes aristogiton C. & R. Felder, 1867
 Yellow rajah, Charaxes marmax (Westwood, 1847)
 Variegated rajah, Charaxes kahruba (Moore 1895)
 Black rajah, Charaxes solon (Fabricius, 1793)

Polyura - nawabs
 Stately nawab, Polyura dolon (Westwood, 1847) (formerly a Rajah)
 Blue nawab, Polyura schreiberi (Godart, 1824)

 Common nawab, Polyura athamas (Drury, 1773)
 Pallid nawab, Polyura arja (C. Felder & R. Felder, 1867)
 Malayan nawab, Polyura moori (Distant, 1883)
 Great nawab, Polyura eudamippus (Doubleday, 1843)
 Jewelled nawab, Polyura delphis (Doubleday, 1843)
 China nawab, Polyura narcaeus (Hewitson, 1854)

Prothoe - blue begum
 Blue begum, Prothoe franck (Godart, 1824)

Agatasa - glorious begum
 Glorious begum, Agatasa calydonia (Hewitson, 1854)

Calinaginae
 Freak, Calinaga buddha Moore, 1857
 Sikkim freak, Calinaga gautama Moore, 1896 (Sikkim, Bhutan)
 Abor freak, Calinaga aborica Tyler, 1915 (Abor Hills)

Heliconiinae

Acraea - tawny coster
 Tawny coster, Acraea violae (Linnaeus, 1758)
 Yellow coster, Acraea issoria (Hübner, 1819)

Cethosia - lacewings
 Red lacewing, Cethosia biblis (Drury, 1773)
 Leopard lacewing, Cethosia cyane (Drury, 1773)
 Tamil lacewing, Cethosia nietneri Felder & Felder, 1867

Boloria - fritillaries
 Jerdon's silverspot, Boloria jerdoni (Lang, 1868)

Issoria - Queen of Spain fritillary
 Queen of Spain fritillary, Issoria lathonia (Linnaeus, 1758)
 Issoria gemmata (Butler, 1881)
 Issoria altissima (Elwes, 1882)
 Issoria mackinnonii (de Nicéville, 1891)

Argynnis - fritillaries and silverstripes
 Indian fritillary, Argynnis hyperbius (Linnaeus, 1763)
 Large silverstripe, Argynnis childreni Gray, 1831
 Argynnis laodice (Pallas, 1771)

Fabriciana - silverstripes
 Common silverstripe, Fabriciana kamala (Moore, 1857)
Fabriciana argyrospilata (Kotsch, 1938)

Speyeria - fritillaries
 Speyeria clara (Blanchard, 1844)

Phalanta - leopards
 Small leopard, Phalanta alcippe (Stoll, 1782)
 Leopard, Phalanta phalantha (Drury, 1773)

Vindula - cruiser
 Cruiser, Vindula erota Fabricius, 1793

Cirrochroa - yeomans
 Large yeoman, Cirrochroa aoris Doubleday, 1847
 Tamil yeoman, Cirrochroa thais (Fabricius, 1787)
 Nicobar yeoman, Cirrochroa nicobarica Wood-Mason, 1881 (Nicobar Is)
 Common yeoman, Cirrochroa tyche Felder & Felder, 1861

Cupha - rustic
 Rustic, Cupha erymanthis (Drury, 1773)

Vagrans - vagrant
 Vagrant, Vagrans egista (Cramer, [1780])

Cyrestinae

Cyrestis - maps
 Marbled map, Cyrestis cocles (Fabricius, 1787)
 Common map, Cyrestis thyodamas Boisduval, 1836
 Nicobar map, Cyrestis tabula de Nicéville, 1883.
 Straight line map, Cyrestis nivea (Zinken-Sommer, 1831)
 Andaman map, Cyrestis andamanensis Staudinger

Chersonesia - maplets
 Common maplet, Chersonesia risa (Doubleday, 1848)
 Intermediate maplet, Chersonesia intermedia Martin, 1895 
 Wavy maplet, Chersonesia rahria (Moore, 1858)

Dichorragia - constable
 Constable, Dichorragia nesimachus (Doyère, 1840)

Stibochiona - popinjay
 Popinjay, Stibochiona nicea (Gray, 1846)

Pseudergolinae
 Tabby, Pseudergolis wedah (Kollar, 1844)

Biblidinae

Ariadne - castors
 Angled castor, Ariadne ariadne (Linnaeus, 1763)
 Common castor, Ariadne merione (Cramer, 1777)

Laringa
 Banded dandy, Laringa horsfieldii (Boisduval, 1833) (Andamans)

Byblia - joker
 Joker, Byblia ilithyia (Drury, 1773)

Apaturinae

Mimathyma - purple emperors
 Sergeant emperor, Mimathyma chevana (Moore, 1866) (Sikkim)
 Indian purple emperor, Mimathyma ambica (Kollar, 1844)

Chitoria - emperors
 Sordid emperor, Chitoria sordida (Moore, 1866)
 Tawny emperor, Chitoria ulupi (Doherty, 1889)

Dilipa - golden emperor
 Golden emperor, Dilipa morgiana (Westwood, 1850)

Eulacera - Tytler's emperor
 Tytler's emperor, Eulaceura manipuriensis Tytler, 1915

Rohana - princes
 Black prince, Rohana parisatis (Westwood, 1850)
 Brown prince, Rohana parvata (Moore, 1857)

Euripus - courtesans
 Painted courtesan, Euripus consimilis (Westwood, 1850)
 Courtesan, Euripus nyctelius (Doubleday, 1845)

Helcyra - white emperors
 White emperor, Helcyra hemina Hewitson, 1864

Herona - pasha
 Pasha, Herona marathus Doubleday, 1848

Hestina - circe
 Circe, Hestina nama (Doubleday, 1845)
 Siren, Hestina persimilis (Westwood, 1850)
 Hestina jermyni H. Druce, 1911 (Himalayas)

Sephisa - courtiers

 Western courtier, Sephisa dichroa (Kollar, 1844)
 Eastern courtier, Sephisa chandra (Moore, 1858)

Nymphalinae

Araschnia - Mongol
 Mongol, Araschnia prorsoides (Blanchard, 1871)

Symbrenthia - jesters
 Common jester, Symbrenthia lilaea Hewitson, 1864 (= Symbrenthia hippoclus in part)
 Spotted jester, Symbrenthia hypselis (Godart, 1824)
 Himalayan jester, Symbrenthia brabira Moore, 1872
 Tytler's jester, Symbrenthia doni Tytler, 1940 (= dalailama Huang, 1998)
 Blue-tail jester, Symbrenthia niphanda Moore, 1872
 Scarce jester, Symbrenthia silana de Nicéville

Vanessa - Indian red admiral
 Indian red admiral, Vanessa indica (Herbst, 1794)
 Painted lady, Vanessa cardui (Linnaeus, 1758)

Nymphalis - tortoiseshells
 Scarce tortoiseshell, Nymphalis xanthomelas (Esper, 1781)

Aglais - tortoiseshells
 Indian tortoiseshell, Aglais caschmirensis (Kollar, [1844])
 Ladakh tortoiseshell, Aglais ladakensis (Moore, 1878)

Polygonia - commas
 Eastern comma, Polygonia egea (Cramer, 1775)
 Polygonia interposita (Staudinger, 1881)

Kaniska - blue admiral
 Blue admiral, Kaniska canace (Linnaeus, 1763)

Junonia - pansies
 Gray pansy, Junonia atlites (Linnaeus, 1763)
 Peacock pansy, Junonia almana (Linnaeus, 1758)
 Yellow pansy, Junonia hierta (Fabricius, 1798)
 Chocolate pansy, Junonia iphita (Cramer, 1779)
 Lemon pansy, Junonia lemonias (Linnaeus, 1758)
 Blue pansy, Junonia orithya (Linnaeus, 1758)

Hypolimnas - eggflys
 Great eggfly, Hypolimnas bolina (Linnaeus, 1758)
 Danaid eggfly, Hypolimnas misippus (Linnaeus, 1764)

Kallima - oakleafs
 Orange oakleaf, Kallima inachus (Boisduval, 1846)
 Andaman oakleaf, Kallima albofasciata (Moore, 1877) (Andaman Is.)
 Scarce blue oakleaf, Kallima alompra (Moore, 1879) (Sikkim)
 South Indian blue oakleaf, Kallima horsfieldii (Kollar, 1844)
 Ceylon blue oakleaf, Kallima philarchus (Westwood, 1848) (Sri Lanka)
 Kallima knyvetti (de Nicéville, 1886) (Bhutan, Assam)
 Indian leafwing, Kallima paralekta (Horsfield, 1829) (Indonesia, Malaysia)

Doleschallia - autumn leaf
 Autumn leaf, Doleschallia bisaltide (Cramer, 1777)

Rhinopalpa - wizard
 Wizard, Rhinopalpa polynice (Cramer, 1779)

Melitaea
 Chitral fritillary, Melitaea chitralensis Moore, 1901
 Shandur fritillary, Melitaea shandura Evans, 1924
 Melitaea sindura Moore, 1865
 Melitaea balbita Moore, 1874
 Melitaea balba Evans, 1912

See also
Nymphalidae
List of butterflies of India

Cited references

References
 
 
 

Nymphalidae

B